The 1993 Nations Cup was held in Gelsenkirchen on November 18–20. Medals were awarded in the disciplines of men's singles, ladies' singles, pair skating, and ice dancing. The compulsory dance was the Tango Romantica.

Results

Men

Ladies

Pairs

Ice dancing

Team

Sources
 Patinage Magazine N°40, p. 64
 Benjamin T. Wright, Skating in America : the 75th Anniversary History of the United States Figure Skating Association. 535 p. Colorado Springs, United States Figure Skating Association. Except p. 484 
 British Eurosport Live coverage

External links
 Skate Canada results

Nations Cup, 1993
Bofrost Cup on Ice